Shirley Alston Reeves (born June 10, 1941), born Shirley Owens, is an American soul singer who was the main lead singer of the hit girl group the Shirelles.

The Shirelles 
In addition to Owens, the Shirelles consisted of classmates of hers from Passaic High School, New Jersey: Doris Kenner Jackson, Addie "Micki" Harris McPhadden and Beverly Lee. Her strong, distinctive voice meant that she was the natural choice for their main lead singer, though Jackson was also featured as lead on several songs as well.

Reeves enjoyed a string of hits with the Shirelles throughout the 1960s, the most notable being Will You Love Me Tomorrow. She left the Shirelles in 1975 to begin a solo career, initially recording under the name "Lady Rose". 

The Shirelles were inducted into the Rock and Roll Hall of Fame in 1996. She also performed on the Doo Wop 51 PBS special in 2000

Solo 
In 1975, she recorded an album entitled With A Little Help From My Friends, after the hit song by the Beatles, which featured members of the Flamingos, the Drifters, Shep and the Limelites, the Five Satins, the Belmonts, Danny & the Juniors, Herman's Hermits and La La Brooks of the Crystals.

Shirley continues to tour under the name 'Shirley Alston Reeves and her Shirelles'.

Personal Life 
Through marriages, she became Shirley Alston and later, Shirley Alston Reeves. Her nephew, Gerald Alston is the lead singer of The Manhattans.

Discography

Albums

Compilation albums

Singles

References

1941 births
Living people
American rhythm and blues singers
Singers from North Carolina
Singers from New Jersey
The Shirelles members
21st-century African-American women singers
20th-century African-American women singers